Deep in the Realm of Conscience  is a 2018 Hong Kong television series produced by TVB, Tengent Penguin Pictures and by producer Mui Siu-ching. It is the sequel to the 2009 drama Beyond the Realm of Conscience. The drama aired five days a week on the TVB network with 45-minute episodes starting May 21, 2018. It stars Nancy Wu, Annie Liu, Steven Ma, Kenneth Ma, Edwin Siu and Alice Chan in this reboot  installment.

Plot 

During the reign of Emperor Shang of Tang, Prince of Ping (Steven Ma), and Princess Taiping (Alice Chan) stage a coup and execute the Empress Dowager Wei (Michelle Yim) who seized power within the court. They support Prince of Xiang (Lee Lung Kei) in reclaiming the throne. The palace appears to be returning to peace, but, the great waves are secretly approaching. Princess Taiping and Prince of Ping begin to be divided like fire and water. Within the inner palace, Prince of Ping 's first wife, Wong Zhen (Nancy Wu) and favorite concubine Zheng Chunxi (Chrissie Chau) compete with their beauty and cannot get along. Fortunately, within the deceitful inner palace, there is rare integrity. The heroic and righteous imperial guards, Yam Sam-Shu (Kenneth Ma) and Ho Lei (Edwin Siu), and the quiet and elegant department heads, Kam Yeuk-chin (Jacqueline Wong), and Yuen Yuet (Annie Liu), are four genuine people that decorate the gloomy and cold palace halls with a brush of romance and add a little mystery. Some people will give up everything for their most beloved, while others will give up their soul for power. A series of unsolved cases occur in the palace. Within the layers and layers of mystery is a long-kept secret. As it is slowly unraveled, it reveals humanity's deep thirst for power and wealth...

Synopsis
During the reign of Emperor Shang of Tang, Lee Longgei (Steven Ma) and his aunt Princess Taiping (Alice Chan) launch a coup that kills ambitious power seeking Empress Wai (Michelle Yim), restoring Prince of Xiang, Li Dan (Lee Lung Kei) to his throne! Beneath the palace's tranquil facade lurks an undercurrent of tension. At the Imperial Court, the rivalry between Lee Longgei & Princess Taiping intensifies into a power struggle! Within the palace, the jealousy and infighting between the head of imperial household bureau, Wong Jun (Nancy Wu), and the emperor's consort is running rampant! Some people act against their conscience for power, while others give up everything else for the sake of their loved ones! The genuine characters demonstrated by General of the Lungmo Guards, Yam Samshu (Kenneth Ma), Captain of the Lungmo Guards Ho Lei (Edwin Siu), palace maids Yuen Yuet (Annie Liu) & Kam Yeuk-chin (Jacqueline Wong) embellish the palace with a touch of romance.... Deep in the palace, layers upon layers of secrets are exposed.

Cast

Main cast

Supporting Cast

Guest Appearance

Reception 
The drama which features a new cast and story was widely compared to its indirect prequel Beyond the Realm of Conscience and received mainly mixed to negative reviews from audiences.

International broadcast

Awards & Nominations

TVB Anniversary Awards 2018

TVB Anniversary Gala 2018

Golden Melody Award for Song of the Year

See also 
Beyond the Realm of Conscience
Can't Buy Me Love

References

TVB dramas
Hong Kong television series
2010s Hong Kong television series